Venza may refer to:

Toyota Venza, motor vehicle
Jac Venza, American television producer